Derek Falvey (born March 19, 1983) is an American baseball executive who is currently the President of Baseball Operations for the Minnesota Twins of Major League Baseball (MLB). Prior to joining the Twins, Falvey was an executive for the Cleveland Indians.

Early life and playing career
Derek Falvey grew up in a small home in Lynn, Massachusetts with his parents Candy and Stephen Falvey and sister Shannon Falvey. He attended Trinity College, and played college baseball for the Trinity Bantams as a pitcher. He graduated with a degree in economics in 2005.

Executive career
In 2007, Falvey began independently scouting players in the Cape Cod Baseball League and used the experience as an opportunity to connect with scouting personnel and Major League executives.  His experience in the league led to an internship with the Cleveland Indians.

Falvey began working for the Cleveland Indians as an intern in 2007. He remained with the Indians, working in the amateur and international scouting departments through 2009 after which he transitioned into Baseball Operations as Assistant Director, Baseball Operations. During the 2011–12 offseason, the Indians promoted Falvey to co-director of baseball operations, along with David Stearns. In 2016, the Indians promoted him to assistant general manager.

On October 3, 2016, the Minnesota Twins hired Falvey as their executive vice president and chief baseball officer. He officially started his duties with the Twins after the Indians lost to the Chicago Cubs in the 2016 World Series. He works with GM Thad Levine.

References

Living people
Baseball pitchers
Trinity Bantams baseball players
Cleveland Indians executives
Minnesota Twins executives
People from Lynn, Massachusetts
1983 births